The Olympia-Einkaufszentrum (OEZ) or Olympia shopping mall is a shopping mall opened in 1972. It is located in the  Moosach district of Munich, Germany. The name comes from the simultaneous construction of the adjacent home of the press for the Summer Olympics in 1972. In 1993–94, the shopping centre was extended and modernized by the Munich architects Hans Baumgarten and Curt O. Schaller.

Shops
The sales area of the OEZ, which belongs to the ECE Project Management, covers 56,000 m2. There are around 135 shops spread across two floors, with three department stores, several major clothing chains, and many grocery stores, service outlets, restaurants and cafes.

Transport
The shopping centre is served by Olympia-Einkaufszentrum station on the Munich U-Bahn on lines U1 and U3, and has 2,400 parking spaces.

2016 shooting

On 22 July 2016, a shooting occurred at the mall. Ten people, including the shooter, were killed and 21 were injured.

References

External links 

 Olympia-Einkaufszentrum
 1973 video

Buildings and structures in Munich
Shopping malls established in 1972
Shopping malls in Germany
1972 establishments in West Germany